Favartia (Favartia) perita is a species of sea snail, a marine gastropod mollusk in the family Muricidae, the murex snails or rock snails.

Description
The size of the shell is 21 mm

Distribution
This species is distributed in the Pacific Ocean along Baja California, Panama and the Galapagos islands.

References

External links
 

Muricidae
Gastropods described in 1844